Laurelin Paige (born November 18, 1974), is an American writer and romance novelist. She has written Novels about  romance and most of her novels have hit New York Times, Wall Street Journal and USA Today best selling list. Paige’s book Fixed Trilogy was listed in People Magazine as a Reader’s Choice 2014 Top Ten book of the year and was the only self published book in the ten top selling books on Amazon.

Biography
Paige was born on November 18, 1974 in Logan, Utah. She grew up in North Logan, Utah, where she attended Sky View High School. She graduated from the University of Northern Colorado with a major in Musical Theater, Acting Emphasis in 1998. She also attended Berklee College of Music for a while on a scholarship for songwriting and voice. Later, she received her Masters of Business Administration with a Marketing Emphasis from Regis University.

Paige had gotten an agent and was on submission to sell her first novel when her husband lost his job as a store manager for Blockbuster due to the business closing. Her family was forced to file for bankruptcy and she decided to try to self-publish for extra income. The bankruptcy was discharged the same month she released her first novel, Fixed on You, in June 2013. Over 20,000 copies were sold within a month. By 2015, she had completed ten novels and her books had sold over one million copies worldwide.

Bibliography

Novels

References

External links
 Official website

1974 births
Living people